Inul Daratista (born Ainur Rokhimah on January 21, 1979) is a dangdut singer and performance artist from Pasuruan, East Java, Indonesia. She became nationally famous in 2003, and is known for her suggestive style of dancing that caused major controversy in Indonesia. Inul is a corrupted version of Ainur, and the singer's childhood pet name. As she began her musical career singing in a 'rock' band, she adopted the stage name Daratista.

Inul Daratista rose to national prominence after a televised January 2003 concert in Jakarta. Her dance moves, which she calls Goyang Inul, goyang-gerudi, or ngebor (lit. 'drilling'), quickly became the source of controversy due to her gyrating hip motions. Some conservative Muslim organizations such as the Indonesian Muslim Council (MUI) called for a ban on her concerts.  She was cited as a reason to pass a national anti-pornography bill that was drafted during the height of the controversy in mid-2003 and became a law in October 2008. Inul's dance style was also criticised by other dangdut singers, most vocally Rhoma Irama, for "corrupting" the genre, though these criticisms did little to dent her popularity.

Name
Inul's birth name, Ainur Rokhimah, means “eyes of blessed love”. Her stage name, Inul Daratista, is often mistranslated as “the girl with breasts”.

Influences
Inul's idols include dangdut singer Rita Sugiarto and pop singers Paramitha Rusady, Shakira, and Jennifer Lopez.

Personal life
When only 16 years old and in her first year of senior high school, Inul on 29 May 1995 married Adam Suseno, who was then 21 years old. The couple's first child, Yusuf Ivander Damares, was born on 19 May 2009.

Discography
2003 Goyang Inul
2004 Separuh Nafas
2005 Too Phat – Rebirth Into Reality
2006 Mau Dong
2006 Ash-Sholaatu
2008 Rasain Lho
2012 Buaya Buntung
2014 Masa Lalu
2015 The Best of Inul Daratista

See also
Censorship of music

References

Living people
1979 births
Anugerah Musik Indonesia winners
Indonesian dangdut singers
21st-century Indonesian women singers
Indonesian television actresses
Javanese people
People from Pasuruan
Obscenity controversies in music
Controversies in Indonesia